The 32nd World Cup season began in October 1997 in Tignes, France, and concluded in March 1998 at the World Cup Finals in Crans-Montana, Switzerland.  The overall winners were Hermann Maier of Austria, his first, and Katja Seizinger of Germany, her second.

A break in the schedule in February was for the Winter Olympics in Nagano, Japan.

Calendar

Men

Ladies

Men

Overall

Downhill

Super G

Giant Slalom

Slalom

Combined

Ladies

Overall

Downhill

Super G

Giant Slalom

Slalom

Combined

References

External links
FIS-ski.com - World Cup Standings - 1998

1997–98
World Cup
World Cup